Eleanor Spencer Stone Perényi (January 4, 1918 – May 3, 2009) was a gardener and author. She wrote several books including Green Thoughts, a collection of essays based on her own gardening experiences.

Biography
Eleanor Perenyi was the daughter of a US Navy officer, Ellis S. Stone and Grace Zaring Stone. Grace Zaring Stone wrote her anti-Nazi novel Escape under the pseudonym Ethel Vance, for fear of jeopardizing the safety of her daughter, who was then living with her husband, the son of the Hungarian noble Baron Zsigmond Perényi, in pro-Fascist Hungary, then to be an ally of the Axis powers during World War II.

Works
Perenyi is best known as the author of Green Thoughts: A Writer in the Garden, which drew on her work on her husband's rural estate near the present-day town of Vynohradiv, Ukraine (the former Nagyszőlős, Hungary). Her life there is further recorded in her 1946 memoir More Was Lost, which describes her marriage to her Hungarian noble husband and the impact of World War II on life in rural Hungary. Her other books include the Civil War novel The Bright Sword (1955) and a study of Franz Liszt.

Green Thoughts was reviewed by Brooke Astor in The New York Times.

More Was Lost was reprinted by New York Review of Books Press in 2016 with an introduction by the poet J.D. McClatchy and is reviewed by Sadie Stein in The Paris Review.

Award
Perenyi was given an award in literature from the American Academy of Arts and Letters in 1982.

References

Further reading

1918 births
2009 deaths
American gardeners
20th-century American writers
20th-century American women writers
American expatriates in Hungary
21st-century American women